Charles George Karle (May 15, 1898 – June 24, 1946) was an American rower who competed in the 1928 Summer Olympics.

In 1928 he was a member of the American boat, which won the silver medal in the coxless fours event.
Karl rowed stroke seat along with U.S. teammates Ernest Bayer, George Healis, and William Miller.

References

External links
 profile

1898 births
1946 deaths
Rowers at the 1928 Summer Olympics
Olympic silver medalists for the United States in rowing
American male rowers
Medalists at the 1928 Summer Olympics